Ömer Ayçiçek (born 2 October 1995) is a Turkish cross-country skier. He competed in the 2018 Winter Olympics.

References

1995 births
Living people
Cross-country skiers at the 2018 Winter Olympics
Turkish male cross-country skiers
Olympic cross-country skiers of Turkey
21st-century Turkish people